MTB Northern Knights is a first-class provincial cricket team in Ireland. Along with the North West Warriors and Leinster Lightning it makes up the Inter-Provincial Championship, and with those teams and Munster Reds makes up the Interprovincial One-Day Trophy & Interprovincial Twenty20 Cup.

The team represents Northern Cricket Union of Ireland which in turn covers most of eastern, southern and much of western Ulster.

History

In 2013, Cricket Ireland formed a three-day Interprovincial Championship, featuring teams from Leinster, NCU and the North West. The NCU team is known as the Northern Knights. On 8 April, they announced Eugene Moleon as their coach and Gavin Rogers as his assistant coach.

Up to and including the 2016 Inter-Provincial Championship, the matches were not given first-class status. However, at an International Cricket Council meeting in October 2016, first-class status was awarded to all future matches.

In January 2016, Simon Johnston head of Waringstown Cricket Club was appointed head coach of team replacing Eugene Moleon.

Current squad
  denotes players with international caps.
Current players are those announced in the core squad for the forthcoming 2021 Inter-Provincial season.
Gary Wilson was named in the initial core squad but has since retired from professional cricket and become Head Coach and Pathway Manager for the North West Warriors. On 4 April, it was announced that Neil Rock would return to the Northern Knights as Wilson's replacement

Grounds

References

External links
The Northern Cricket Union official website
Euro Slam

 
Irish first-class cricket teams
2017 establishments in Ireland
Cricket in Northern Ireland